Caddo Mills Independent School District is a public school district based in Caddo Mills, Texas (USA).  The district serves students in southwestern Hunt County.

In 2009, the school district was rated "recognized" by the Texas Education Agency.

Schools
Caddo Mills High School (Grades 9–12)
Caddo Mills Middle School (Grades 7–8)
Caddo Mills Intermediate School (Grades 5-6)
Griffis Elementary School (Grades PK-4)
Lee Elementary School (Grades PK-4)

References

External links
 

School districts in Hunt County, Texas